The Cathedral of Christ the Saviour is the principal Orthodox church in Transcarpathia. It dominates the Cyril and Methodius Square in the city of Uzhhorod.

The 60-metre-tall five-domed church was built in the 1990s after the cathedral of the Holy Cross had been restituted to the Greek Catholic Eparchy of Mukachevo. The modern building can hold up to 5000 worshippers. Its ground floor contains a chapel dedicated to the Exaltation of the Holy Cross. The arch-priest is Dmytro Sydor.

The cathedral belongs to Eparchy of Mukachevo and Uzhhorod of the Ukrainian Orthodox Church. In 2008 the building was raided by the national security agency on suspicion of separatist activities.

See also 
 Eparchy of Mukačevo and Prešov
 List of largest Orthodox cathedrals

References

External links 
 

Orthodox Cathedral
Orthodox Cathedral
Tourist attractions in Zakarpattia Oblast